Henabad-e Olya (also Romanized as Henābād-e ‘Olyā and Hanābād-e ‘Olyā; also known as Haneh Abad Olyā, Hīnābād Bālā, and Hīnābād-e Bālā) is a village in Peyghan Chayi Rural District, in the Central District of Kaleybar County, East Azerbaijan Province, Iran. At the 2006 census, its population was 102, in 23 families.

References 

Populated places in Kaleybar County